Joan Hoff (born June 27, 1937), also known as Joan Hoff-Wilson, is an American historian, research professor, editor, and author. She specializes in U.S. foreign policy, U.S. political history, biographies, women's history, and law history. Hoff is the former director of the Contemporary History Institute at Ohio University. She has worked at California State University, Sacramento; Arizona State University; Indiana University; and Montana State University. She retired in 2001 and lives between Big Sky, Montana and New York City, as of 2003.

Biography 
Joan Hoff was born on June 27, 1937, in Butte, Montana. She attended the University of Montana where she received a BA degree (1957); Cornell University where she received a MA degree (1959) and was a Woodrow Wilson Fellow; and University of California, Berkeley where she received a PhD (1966). Hoff received a Fulbright Award (1958 to 1959) for study at the University of Strasbourg.

Hoff has taught at the following universities and colleges: the College of San Mateo; California State University, Sacramento from 1967 to 1970; Arizona State University from 1970 to 1976; Dartmouth College; Indiana University from 1981 to 1998; Ohio University from 1998 to ?; and Montana State University.

Historian Susan Kingsley Kent criticized Hoff's article, Gender as a postmodern category of paralysis (1994, Women's History Review), as it "breaks no new intellectual ground, but for anti-intellectualism, disingenuousness, and sheer incivility". In the 1990s, she has appeared as a panelist in discussions broadcast by C-Span.

in 1981, Hoff was awarded a Guggenheim Fellowship in the field of U.S. history. She has also received the Vivian Paladin Award, and fellowships to the Woodrow Wilson International Center for Scholars and the Radcliffe Institute, as well as a National Endowment of the Humanities research grant.

Books

References

1937 births
Living people
20th-century American historians
21st-century American historians
American women historians
Historians from Montana
Historians of American foreign relations
People from Butte, Montana
20th-century American women writers
21st-century American women writers
University of Montana alumni
Cornell University alumni
University of California, Berkeley alumni
College of San Mateo faculty
California State University, Sacramento faculty
Arizona State University faculty
Dartmouth College faculty
Indiana University faculty
Ohio University faculty
Montana State University faculty